In prehistoric archaeology, an avenue is a long, parallel-sided strip of land, measuring up to about 30m in width, open at either end, with edges marked by stone or timber alignments and/or a low earth bank and ditch. The term is used for such features all over the British Isles but they are concentrated in the centre and south of England.

Most are either short and straight (Type I, less than 800m long), or long and curving (Type II, up to 2.5 km). It has been noted that they often link stone circles with rivers. They are a common element to Bronze Age ritual landscapes.

Avenues are identified through their earthworks or using aerial archaeology, as their parallel features can be seen stretching over some distance. In most examples, it is the association of the avenue with other contemporary monuments that provides diagnosis. Avenues differ from cursus monuments, in that the latter also have earthworks at their terminal ends and have no upright stone or timber alignments.

Avenues are thought to have been ceremonial or processional paths and to be of early Bronze Age date. They seem to have been used to indicate the intended route of approach to a particular monument.

Examples in Britain include the Stonehenge Avenue, and Beckhampton Avenue and West Kennet Avenue at Avebury. An example in Ireland is the avenue going up the Hill of Tara.

External links
 Gazetteer of Avenues at the Megalithic Portal

Archaeology of the United Kingdom
Megalithic monuments
Types of monuments and memorials